Eupithecia rebeli is a moth in the family Geometridae. It is found in Uzbekistan.

References

Moths described in 1893
rebeli
Moths of Asia